Mike Belshe (born 1971) is an American computer scientist and entrepreneur. He‘s a co-founder and CEO of BitGo, Inc. and a cofounder of Lookout Software in 2004. He is the co-inventor of the SPDY protocol and one of the principal authors of the HTTP/2.0 specification.

Belshe received his bachelor's degree in computer science from California Polytechnic State University, San Luis Obispo.

Belshe started his career at Hewlett-Packard, followed by Silicon Valley startup Netscape Communications Corp., where he worked on the Netscape Enterprise Server. After Netscape he joined Good Technology before co-founding Lookout Software with Eric Hahn. In 2006, he joined Google, was one of the first engineers on the Google Chrome team, and was part of the Google Chrome Comic. As part of the Chrome team he worked on protocol research, and later co-founded the SPDY protocol. He submitted SPDY to the IETF in 2011, and was an author of HTTP/2. As part of the IETF standardization effort, Belshe argued for encryption by default within the protocol.

References

Living people
1961 births
American computer businesspeople
People associated with Bitcoin